The PEN/Bellwether Prize for Socially Engaged Fiction, formerly known as the Bellwether Prize for Fiction is a biennial award given by the PEN America (formerly PEN American Center) and Barbara Kingsolver to a U.S. citizen for a previously unpublished work of fiction that address issues of social justice. The prize was established by noted author Barbara Kingsolver, and is funded by her. Winning authors receive a $25,000 award and a publishing contract, from which they receive royalties.

Submissions are judged by a panel of authors whose work shows themes of social change. Authors who have served as judges include: Russell Banks, Martin Espada, Terry Karten, Maxine Hong Kingston, Ursula K. Le Guin, Barry Lopez, Toni Morrison, Ruth Ozeki, Grace Paley, and Anna Quindlen.

In May 2011, PEN American Center announced it would take over administration of the prize, which will be known as the PEN/Bellwether Prize. The award is one of many PEN awards sponsored by International PEN affiliates in over 145 PEN centres around the world. The PEN American Center awards have been characterized as being among the "major" American literary prizes.

Winners

See also 

 Bellwether

References

External links
Bellwether Prize 

PEN America awards
Awards established in 2000
2000 establishments in the United States
American fiction awards
Literary awards honouring human rights